Biotin-independent malonate decarboxylase (malonate decarboxylase (without biotin), malonate decarboxylase, MDC) is an enzyme with systematic name malonate carboxy-lyase (biotin-independent). This enzyme catalyses the following chemical reaction

 malonate + H+  acetate + CO2

Two types of malonate decarboxylase are currently known, both of which form multienzyme complexes.

References

External links 
 

EC 4.1.1